Harry Jonathan "Jay" Pettibone (born June 21, 1957) is an American former professional baseball starting pitcher, who played in Major League Baseball (MLB) for the 1983 Minnesota Twins. He batted and threw right-handed.

Pettibone was drafted by the Texas Rangers in the 25th round (743rd overall) of the 1979 MLB draft.

After the Rangers released Pettibone following the 1980 season, he signed with the Twins during spring training 1981.

Pettibone made his MLB debut on September 11, 1983, a complete game loss in which he allowed only three runs. In his brief four-game career, he posted a win–loss record of 0–4, with a 5.33 earned run average, and 10 strikeouts, while hurling 27 innings.

Following Pettibone’s trade to the St. Louis Cardinals in December 1984, he retired from professional baseball.

Pettibone's son, Jonathan, played MLB for the 2013–14 Philadelphia Phillies.

References

External links

1957 births
Living people
Baseball players from Michigan
Chapman Panthers baseball players
Fullerton Hornets baseball players
Minnesota Twins players
People from Mount Clemens, Michigan
Sportspeople from Metro Detroit